The Christie Direct Action Motor Car Company was a New York City-based automobile manufacturer. It was founded by race driver and inventor J. Walter Christie in 1904, and lasted until 1910.

History 
The Christie Company was originally called Christie Iron Works, but the name was changed in 1906. Christie was America's first exponent of front-wheel drive. In 1904, he took a four-cylinder, 30 hp racer to Daytona Beach with an early front-wheel drive system. In all, six racers were built, two with 60 hp engines.

Production models 
The Christie Company produced a gran touring car in 1907 with a 50 hp engine costing $6,500 and 2,300 lbs. Also, the company produced a taxi cab.

Demise 
Walter Christie spent most of his time racing and not promoting his cars. Because of this, the company folded in 1910.

Notes

Defunct motor vehicle manufacturers of the United States
American companies established in 1904
Vehicle manufacturing companies disestablished in 1910
Vehicle manufacturing companies established in 1904
1904 establishments in New York City
1910 disestablishments in New York (state)
American companies disestablished in 1910